The 130 K 90-60 is a Finnish towed 130 mm coastal artillery piece, manufactured in the 1980s by Vammas.

History

The development process for the 130 K 90-60 began in 1960 when the Finnish company Tampella presented their concept of a new 122 mm gun for the Finnish Army. This gun was called 122 K 60. It was a sound concept, but quite a heavy gun. It was only ordered in small numbers and it was never part of the war-time inventory.

15 guns were later modified by Vammas in the late 1980s, giving it a 130 mm calibre barrel. This was done in order to standardize the calibre for the mobile coastal artillery. The new gun was given the designation 130 K 90-60.

The gun carriage design was used for Tampella's 155 mm series, as well as for the Israeli Soltam M-68 gun.

Operators
: Finnish Navy, 15 units.

See also
130 53 TK
130 K 54

External links
Rannikon Puolustaja 2/1996

References 

Tampella
Field artillery
130 mm artillery
130 K 90-60
Military equipment introduced in the 1980s